David Wyndham Lewis (born 18 December 1940 in Cardiff) is a Welsh former cricketer active from 1960 to 1973 who played for Glamorgan and Transvaal. He appeared in 14 first-class matches as a righthanded batsman who bowled leg break and googly. He scored 122 runs with a highest score of 29* and took 21 wickets with a best performance of four for 42.

Notes

1940 births
Welsh cricketers
Glamorgan cricketers
Living people